Sextus Cocceius Severianus was a Roman senator who flourished during the reign of Antoninus Pius. An unpublished military diploma attests that he was governor of Roman Arabia on 12 August 145; Severianus was promoted to suffect consul in 147, with first Tiberius Licinius Cassius Cassianus then Gaius Popilius Carus Pedo as his colleague. Between 161 and 163 he was Proconsul of Africa.

He married Caesonia; their known children include a son, Sextus Cocceius Severianus; Sextus Cocceius Vibianus (flourished c. 204), is a known grandson.

See also
 Cocceia gens

References 

2nd-century Romans
2nd-century Roman governors of Arabia Petraea
Roman legates
Roman governors of Arabia Petraea
Suffect consuls of Imperial Rome
Roman governors of Africa
Year of birth unknown
Year of death unknown
Severianus, Sextus